Zdzislaw Kotla (5 May 1949 in Szczecin – 18 October 2012 in Szczecin) was a Polish Olympic sailor. He was the brother of Ryszard Kotla.

Biography
He was a member of the Yachting Club Pogoń in Szczecin. From 1976 he sailed in the Soling class. He competed in the 1980 Summer Olympics in Moscow (Tallinn) in a team with Jan Bartosik and Jerzy Wujecki.

Achievements
  1st place in the International Hungarian Championship in 1979
  5th place in the International Danish Championship in 1980
  9th place in the 1980 Summer Olympics: Soling Class – with a result of 91.70 (the winner Denmark had a result of 34.70). The placement of the Polish team in the consecutive races: 8–6–4–8–9–9–8.

Bibliography
Anna Pawlak, Olimpijczycy: polscy sportowcy w latach 1924-1998 ("The Olympic Athletes: the Polish sportsmen between 1924-1998"), p. 128
Zbigniew Porada, Starożytne i nowożytne igrzyska olimpijskie ("The Ancient and Modern Olympic Games"), p. 1009
Zygmunt Głuszek, Polscy olimpijczycy 1924-1984 ("The Polish Olympic Athletes 1924-1984"), Warsaw 1988

References

External links
 Zdzisław Kotla - Polish Sailing Encyclopedia (pl.)

1949 births
2012 deaths
Polish male sailors (sport)
Sailors at the 1980 Summer Olympics – Soling
Sportspeople from Szczecin
Olympic sailors of Poland